Allbiz is an online business-to-business (B2B) and business-to-consumer (B2C) marketplace for E-Commerce. The company's key products are package services for business online promotion at the territory of the interest (a kind of business online promotion). The company is headquartered in Cyprus, EU-zone. Its other 24 representative offices are located in 13 countries:  Russia, Ukraine, Kazakhstan, Moldova, Azerbaijan, Uzbekistan, Georgia, Poland, Romania, Greece, Egypt, India and China. 
Allbiz was founded in 1999 as an informational platform helping businesses to find partners and buyers online.

Today the project joints the markets of 90 countries and features information about more than 20 million products and services from 1.3 million companies. According to Google Analytics its daily visitors’ amount reaches 700 thousand from 240 countries and regions from all over the world. It  supports 26 languages, including English, German, Spanish, French, Portuguese, Russian, Ukrainian, Polish, Romanian, Hungarian, Bulgarian, Dutch, Chinese, Czech, Turkish, Italian, Arabic, Persian, Japanese, Korean, Vietnamese, Greek, Hebrew, Norwegian, Finnish and Swedish. Any product or service listed in the directory is automatically displayed in all supported languages.

In 2011 allbiz was ranked by Google "TOP 1,000 most visited sites on the web" rating at 415th place among other the most visited web-sites of the world.

History 
1999 - online catalogue laid the foundation for the emergence of allbiz.
2006 - the catalogue evolves into an international resource ALL-BIZ.INFO, containing detailed information about goods and services of the companies from Russia, Ukraine, Moldova, Kazakhstan and Belarus.
2010 - the company attracts the investments, changes its name to allbiz and moves to  domain www.all.biz. Since this time the company started to operate at a global level.

References

External links
 www.all.biz
 Get online contest promotion

Online marketplaces of Cyprus